In Greek mythology, Aega (Ancient Greek: Αίγη) or Pine or Cynosura or Melissa was, according to Hyginus, a daughter of Olenus, who was a descendant of Hephaestus. Aega and her sister Helice nursed the infant Zeus in Crete, and the former was afterwards changed by the god into the constellation called Capella.

Mythology 
According to other traditions mentioned by Hyginus, Aega was a daughter of Melisseus, king of Crete, and was chosen to suckle the infant Zeus; but as she was found unable to do it, the service was performed by the goat Amalthea. Hyginus also reports a tradition that while married to Pan she had a son by Zeus whom she called Aegipan.

According to other authors, Aega was a daughter of Helios and of such dazzling brightness that the Titans in their attack upon Olympus became frightened and requested their mother Gaia to conceal her in the earth.  She was accordingly confined in a cave in Crete, where she became the nurse of Zeus. In the Titanomachy, Zeus was commanded by an oracle to cover himself with her skin (aegis). He obeyed the command and raised Aega among the stars.

Similar, though somewhat different accounts, were given by Euemerus and others. It is clear that in some of these stories Aega is regarded as a nymph, and in others as a goat, though the two ideas are not kept clearly distinct from each other.

Notes

References 

 Antoninus Liberalis, The Metamorphoses of Antoninus Liberalis translated by Francis Celoria (Routledge 1992). Online version at the Topos Text Project.
 Aratus Solensis, Phaenomena translated by G. R. Mair. Loeb Classical Library Volume 129. London: William Heinemann, 1921. Online version at the Topos Text Project.
 Aratus Solensis, Phaenomena. G. R. Mair. London: William Heinemann; New York: G.P. Putnam's Sons. 1921. Greek text available at the Perseus Digital Library.
 Bell, Robert E., Women of Classical Mythology: A Biographical Dictionary. ABC-Clio. 1991. .
 Gaius Julius Hyginus, Astronomica from The Myths of Hyginus translated and edited by Mary Grant. University of Kansas Publications in Humanistic Studies. Online version at the Topos Text Project.
 Lactantius, Divine Institutes translated by William Fletcher (1810-1900). From Ante-Nicene Fathers, Vol. 7. Edited by Alexander Roberts, James Donaldson, and A. Cleveland Coxe. Buffalo, NY: Christian Literature Publishing Co., 1886. Online version at the Topos Text Project.

Children of Helios
Divine women of Zeus
Nymphs